Régis Avila (born 17 October 1962) is a Brazilian fencer. He competed in the sabre and épée events at the 1988 Summer Olympics.

References

External links
 

1962 births
Living people
Brazilian male épée fencers
Olympic fencers of Brazil
Fencers at the 1988 Summer Olympics
Brazilian male sabre fencers
20th-century Brazilian people